This is a list of sites and peoples visited by the Hernando de Soto Expedition in the years 1539–1543. In May 1539, de Soto left Havana, Cuba, with nine ships, over 620 men and 220 surviving horses and landed at Charlotte Harbor, Florida. This began his three-year odyssey through the Southeastern North American continent, from which de Soto and a large portion of his men would not return.

They met many varied Native American groups, most of them bands and chiefdoms related to the widespread Mississippian culture. Only a few of these ancestral cultures survived into the seventeenth century, or their descendants combined as historic tribes known to later Europeans. Others have been recorded only in the written historical accounts of de Soto's expedition.

Florida

 Uzita
 Mocoso
 Urriparacoxi
 Timucua
 Ocale
 Acuera
 Potano
 Alachua culture
 Northern Utina
 Yustaga
 Uzachile
 Anhaica
 Apalachee
 Narváez expedition's "Bay of Horses"

Georgia

The peoples the expedition encountered in Georgia were speakers of Muskogean languages. The expedition made two journeys through Georgia - the first heading northeast to Cofitachequi in South Carolina, and the second heading southwest from Tennessee, at which point they visited the Coosa chiefdom.

First Leg
 Capachequi
 Ichisi
 Ocute
 Hitchiti
After leaving Ocute, the expedition crossed the "Wilderness of Ocute" (the modern-day Savannah River basin) to arrive in present-day South Carolina. Artifacts from the first leg have been found in Telfair County, Georgia.

Second Leg

All territory the expedition crossed through during this leg was under the control of Coosa, a paramount chiefdom with territory in Georgia, Alabama, and Tennessee. 
 Coosa chiefdom
 Little Egypt, the likely site of the Coosa capital
 Sixtoe Mound
 Bell Field Mound Site
 Etowah Indian Mounds (Talimachusi)

South Carolina
The primary destination of the expedition in South Carolina was the paramount chiefdom of Cofitachequi. The people of this chiefdom were likely the ancestors of the modern Cherokee and Catawba. 
 Hymahi
 Cofitachequi, likely located at the present Mulberry Plantation
 Talimeco

North Carolina
 Joara, near Morganton, North Carolina
 Cheraw (tribe) 
 Chelaque

Tennessee

 Chiska 
 Chiaha
 Coste
 Tali
 Chalahume
 Satapo

Alabama
Parts of Coosa extended into Alabama. The other primary chiefdom encountered by the expedition was that of Tuscaluza. The peoples encountered in Alabama were likely the ancestors of the modern Creek, Alabama, and Choctaw. 
 Abihka
 Chief Tuskaloosa
 Mabila
 Tali

Mississippi

 Chicaza
 Quizquiz
 Walls phase
 Quigate
 Quigualtam
 Natchez people

Arkansas
 Aquixo
 Casqui, believed by many archaeologists to be the same as the site of the Parkin Archeological State Park.  
 Pacaha, believed by many archaeologists to be the Nodena site. 
 Chaguate
 Coligua 
 Tunica people
 Tula people
 Anilco, possibly the Menard complex in the southeastern corner of the state.
 Guachoya
 Quapaw
 Caddoans
 Aays Caddo confederacy.
 Naguatex

Texas
All the peoples which the expedition encountered in Texas were the ancestors of the modern Caddo, especially the Hasinai and Kadohadacho confederacies. Intentionally misled by their Caddo guides, the expedition wandered around Texas while only encountering a few major Caddo centers, though there were many that lay not far beyond where they traveled. Eventually they were forced to turn around after reaching the River of Daycao, variously identified as the Brazos, Trinity, or even the Colorado. Beyond Daycao, the chroniclers of the expedition claimed that people did not grow maize and subsisted off the land as hunter-gatherers.

As this leg of the expedition took place after the death of both de Soto and Juan Ortiz, his primary translator, the records are more sparse and reveal less information than in earlier parts of the journey.
 Caddo
 Nadaco (Nondacao)
 Hasinai
 Soacatino
 Adai (Native American culture)

See also 
 Alabama language
 Caddoan languages
 Cherokee language
 Chickasaw language
 Choctaw language
 Creek language
 Etowah Indian Mounds
 Hitchiti
 Lake Jackson Mounds Archaeological State Park
 Lake Village, Arkansas
 Mississippian culture
 Moundville Archaeological Site
 Ocmulgee National Monument
 Pisgah phase
 Southeastern Ceremonial Complex
 Timucua language
 Yamasee
 Yazoo tribe

References

Native American history
Native American populated places
Native American-related lists
Colonial United States (Spanish)
Expeditions from Spain
1540s in New Spain
1540s in North America
Spanish exploration in the Age of Discovery
Late Mississippian culture
Mississippian culture
Native American history of Alabama
Native American history of Arkansas
Native American history of Florida
Native American history of Georgia (U.S. state)
Native American history of Mississippi
Native American history of North Carolina
Native American history of South Carolina
Native American history of Tennessee
Native American history of Texas
Colonial Louisiana
Spanish Florida
Spanish Texas
Archaeology of the United States
Eastern United States
Southeastern United States
Spanish colonization of the Americas
16th century in North America